Kévin Manuel Rodrigues (born 5 March 1994) is a professional footballer who plays for Turkish club Adana Demirspor. Mainly a left-back, he can also play as a midfielder.

He has spent most of his career in Spain with Real Sociedad, after starting out at Toulouse.

Born in France, Rodrigues originally represented France internationally before switching to Portugal in 2017.

Club career

France
Born in Bayonne, Nouvelle-Aquitaine to Portuguese parents, Rodrigues made his senior debut with Toulouse FC on 20 May 2012, coming on as a 69th-minute substitute in a 0–2 Ligue 1 home loss against AC Ajaccio.

In his country of birth, Rodrigues also represented Dijon FCO, appearing rarely for the Ligue 2 club as it finished in fourth place in the 2014–15 season.

Real Sociedad
Rodrigues signed for Real Sociedad on 4 June 2015, being initially assigned to the reserves in Segunda División B. His first game in La Liga with the first team took place on 29 January 2017, when he started in a 3–0 away defeat to Real Madrid.

On 1 March 2017, Rodrigues renewed his contract until 2020, and was promoted to the main squad ahead of the 2017–18 campaign. He scored his first league goal on 17 September, but also added one in his own net in a 1–3 home loss also against Real Madrid.

On 2 September 2019, after losing space to newcomer Aihen Muñoz, mainly due to injuries, Rodrigues was loaned to fellow top-tier side CD Leganés for one year. On 12 September 2020, he moved to SD Eibar of the same league also in a temporary deal.

Rodrigues moved to Rayo Vallecano also in the Spanish top flight on 11 August 2021, on a one-year loan.

Adana Demirspor
On 10 June 2022, Rodrigues signed a three-year contract with Adana Demirspor effective as of 1 July when he became a free agent.

International career
Rodrigues was a France youth international, having represented his nation at under-18 level. On 3 November 2016 he was first called up to the Portugal under-21 side, being part of the squad that appeared in the following year's UEFA European Championship.

Rodrigues won his first full cap on 10 November 2017, playing the entire 3–0 friendly win over Saudi Arabia in Viseu.

Career statistics

Club

International

Honours
France U19
UEFA European Under-19 Championship runner-up: 2013

References

External links

1994 births
Living people
French people of Portuguese descent
Citizens of Portugal through descent
French-Basque people
Sportspeople from Bayonne
French footballers
Portuguese footballers
Footballers from Nouvelle-Aquitaine
Association football defenders
Association football midfielders
Ligue 1 players
Ligue 2 players
Aviron Bayonnais FC players
Toulouse FC players
Dijon FCO players
La Liga players
Segunda División B players
Real Sociedad B footballers
Real Sociedad footballers
CD Leganés players
SD Eibar footballers
Rayo Vallecano players
Süper Lig players
Adana Demirspor footballers
France youth international footballers
Portugal under-21 international footballers
Portugal international footballers
French expatriate footballers
Portuguese expatriate footballers
Expatriate footballers in Spain
Expatriate footballers in Turkey
French expatriate sportspeople in Spain
Portuguese expatriate sportspeople in Spain
French expatriate sportspeople in Turkey
Portuguese expatriate sportspeople in Turkey